Rufus Oldenburger (6 July 1908, Grand Rapids, Michigan – 22 November 1969) was an American mathematician and mechanical engineer.

Education and career
Oldenburger received an A.B. degree from the University of Chicago in 1928, a master's degree in mathematics in 1930, and a Ph.D. in 1934. After teaching mathematics at the University of Michigan, at the Case Institute of Technology, at Illinois Institute of Technology, and at DePaul University, he changed the focus of his research from pure mathematics to mechanical engineering and automatic control. He was an invited speaker at the International Congress of Mathematicians in 1936 at Oslo. For the academic year 1937–38 he was a visiting scholar at the Institute for Advanced Study in Princeton.

His 1939 paper, "Exponent trajectories in symbolic dynamics", introduced the integer sequence now known as the Oldenburger–Kolakoski sequence.

In 1968, he was the first recipient of the Rufus Oldenburger Medal, an annually awarded medal named in his honor by the American Society of Mechanical Engineers.

Selected publications

Articles

 (See also: Kolakoski sequence.)

with Arthur Porges: 

with C. C. Liu: 
with Rangasami Sridhar: 
with R. E. Goodson: 
with Javeed S. Ansari:

Books
 
as editor: 

as editor:  
with R. C. Boyer:

Patents
"Non-linear speed and load governor for alternators." U.S. Patent No. 2,908,826. 13 Oct. 1959.
"Method and apparatus for controlling a condition." U.S. Patent No. 2,960,629. 15 Nov. 1960.
with Forrest Drake George: "Method and apparatus for hydraulic control systems." U.S. Patent No. 2,931,342. 5 Apr. 1960.
with F. D. George: "Hydraulic differentiation." U.S. Patent No. 2,992,650. 18 Jul. 1961.
"Hydraulic governors." U.S. Patent No. 3,051,138. 28 Aug. 1962.
"Automatic control system." U.S. Patent No. 3,163,813. 29 Dec. 1964.
"Hydraulic governor mechanism having plural error detecting means." U.S. Patent No. 3,238,956. 8 Mar. 1966.

References

1908 births
1969 deaths
20th-century American mathematicians
20th-century American engineers
Mechanical engineers
University of Chicago alumni
Purdue University faculty
Institute for Advanced Study visiting scholars
People from Grand Rapids, Michigan